Pireh Yusefian-e Olya (also Romanized as Pīreh Yūsefīān-e ‘Olyā) is a village in Yeylaq Rural District, in the Central District of Kaleybar County, East Azerbaijan Province, Iran. At the 2006 census, its population was 44, in 9 families.

References 

Populated places in Kaleybar County